The Mental Calculation World Cup (German: Weltmeisterschaften im Kopfrechnen, or World Championship in Mental Calculation) is an international competition for mental calculators, held every two years in Germany.

Mental Calculation World Cup 2004
The first Mental Calculation World Cup was held in Annaberg-Buchholz, Germany on 30 October 2004. There were 17 participants from 10 countries.

The World Cup involved the following contests (and two surprise tasks):
Adding ten 10-digit numbers, 10 tasks in 10 minutes
Winner: Alberto Coto (Spain); 10 correct results; 5:50 minutes, world record
Multiplying two 8-digit numbers, 10 tasks in 15 minutes
Winner: Alberto Coto (Spain), 8 correct results
Calendar Calculations, two series one minute each, dates from the years 1600–2100
Winner: Matthias Kesselschläger (Germany), 33 correct results, world record
Square Root from 6-digit numbers, 10 tasks in 15 minutes
Winner: Jan van Koningsveld (Germany)

In the overall ranking the first place is taken by Robert Fountain (Great Britain), the runner-up was Jan van Koningsveld (Germany).

Mental Calculation World Cup 2006

The second Mental Calculation World Cup was held on 4 November 2006 in the Mathematikum museum in Gießen, Germany.
26 Calculators from 11 countries took part.
The World Cup involved the following contests (and two surprise tasks):
Adding ten 10-digit numbers, 10 tasks in 10 minutes
Winner: Jorge Arturo Mendoza Huertas (Peru); 10 correct results
Multiplying two 8-digit numbers, 10 tasks in 15 minutes
Winner: Alberto Coto (Spain)
Calendar Calculations, two series one minute each, dates from the years 1600–2100
Winner: Matthias Kesselschläger (Germany)
Square Root from 6-digit numbers, 10 tasks in 15 minutes
Winner: Robert Fountain (Great Britain)

Robert Fountain (Great Britain) defended his title in the overall competition, the places 2 to 4 have been won by Jan van Koningsveld (Netherlands), Gert Mittring (Germany) and Yusnier Viera Romero (Cuba).

Mental Calculation World Cup 2008

The Mental Calculation World Cup 2008 was held at the University of Leipzig, Germany on 1 July 2008. It attracted 28 calculators from 12 countries.

Adding ten 10-digit numbers, 10 tasks in 10 minutes
Winner: Alberto Coto (Spain), 10 correct results in 4:26 minutes. world record
Multiplying two 8-digit numbers, 10 tasks in 15 minutes
Winner: Alberto Coto (Spain), 10 correct results in 8:25 minutes, world record
Calendar Calculations, dates from the years 1600–2100, one minute
Winner: Jan van Koningsveld (Germany), 40 correct results
Square Root from 6-digit numbers, 10 tasks in 15 minutes
Winner: Jan van Koningsveld (Germany)

Alberto Coto (Spain) won the overall title. Jan van Koningsveld, starting for Germany this time, became second, and Jorge Arturo Mendoza Huertas (Peru) finished third. Robert Fountain, who won the title in 2004 and 2006, achieved a fourth rank.

Mental Calculation World Cup 2010

The Mental Calculation World Cup 2010 was held at the University of Magdeburg, Germany on 6–7 June 2010. It attracted 33 calculators from 13 countries.

Adding ten 10-digit numbers, 10 tasks in 10 minutes
Winner: Alberto Coto (Spain), 10 correct results in 3:42 minutes, world record
Multiplying two 8-digit numbers, 10 tasks in 15 minutes
Winner:  (Spain), 10 correct results in 4:56 minutes, world record
Calendar Calculations, dates from the years 1600–2100, one minute
Winner: Yusnier Viera (Cuba), 48 correct results, world cup record
Square Root from 6-digit numbers, 10 tasks in 6:51 minutes,' world cup record
Winner: Priyanshi Somani (India)
Most Versatile Calculator (the best score for solving six unknown "surprise tasks")
 Winner: Gerald Newport (U.S.)

Priyanshi Somani (India) won the overall title.  (Spain) came second, and Alberto Coto finished third.

Mental Calculation World Cup 2012

The Mental Calculation World Cup 2012 was held from 30/9/2012 to 01/10/2012 in the Mathematikum museum in Gießen, Germany.
32 calculators from 16 countries participated. 
The world cup involved the following 5 main contests :
Adding ten 10-digit numbers, 10 tasks in 7 minutes
Winner: Naofumi Ogasawara (Japan);  10 correct results in 191 seconds, world record
Multiplying two 8-digit numbers, 10 tasks in 10 minutes
Winner: Freddis Reyes Hernández (Cuba), 10 correct results in 361 seconds
Calendar Calculations, One minute, random dates from the years 1600–2100
Winner: Myagmarsuren Tuuruul (Mongolia), 57 correct results, world cup record
Square Roots from 6-digit numbers, 10 tasks in 10 minutes
Winner: Naofumi Ogasawara (Japan), 8 correct results (each solved, up to all the first 8 digits: 3 integers and 5 decimals)
Most Versatile Calculator (the best score for solving another 5 unknown "surprise tasks")
 Winner: Naofumi Ogasawara (Japan), 500, perfect score.

Naofumi Ogasawara (Japan) won the title in the overall competition (combination of all 10 categories). Hua Wei Chan (Malaysia) was 2nd overall, and Jan van Koningsveld was 3rd.

Mental Calculation World Cup 2014

The Mental Calculation World Cup 2014 was held from 10/10/2014 to 12/10/2014 in the Faculty of Mathematics in Dresden University of Technology, Germany.

39 mental calculators from 17 countries participated.

The World Cup involved the following 5 main contests:
Adding ten 10-digit numbers, 10 tasks in 7 minutes
Winner: Granth Thakkar (India);  10 correct results in 242 seconds, 
Multiplying two 8-digit numbers, 10 tasks in 10 minutes
Winner:  (Spain), 10 correct results in 295 seconds, world cup record
Calendar Calculations, one minute, random dates from the years 1600–2100
Winner:  (Spain), 64 correct results, world cup record
Square Roots from 6-digit numbers, 10 tasks in 10 minutes
Winner: Rhea Shah (India), 10 correct results in 135 seconds (each solved to eight significant figures), world cup record
Most Versatile Calculator (the best score for solving another 5 unknown "surprise tasks")
Winner: Andreas Berger (Germany), 365/500

Granth Thakkar (India) won the title in the overall competition (combination of all 10 categories).  (Spain) was 2nd overall, and Chie Ishikawa (Japan) was 3rd.

Mental Calculation World Cup 2016

The Mental Calculation World Cup 2016 was held from 23 to 25 September 2016, in Bielefeld Germany. 31 mental calculators from 16 countries participated.

The World Cup involved the following 5 main contests:
Adding ten 10-digit numbers, 7 minutes
Winner: Yuki Kimura (Japan) 
Multiplying two 8-digit numbers, 10 minutes
Winner: Lee Jeonghee (South Korea)
Calendar Calculations, one minute, random dates from the years 1600–2100
Winner: Georgi Georgiev (Bulgaria), 66 correct results, world cup record
Square Roots from 6-digit numbers,  10 minutes
Winner: Yuki Kimura (Japan) 
Most Versatile Calculator (the best score for solving another 5 unknown "surprise tasks")
Winner: Lee Jeonghee (South Korea)
Memoriad Trophy 
Winner: Yuki Kimura (Japan)

Yuki Kimura (Japan)  won the title in the overall competition (combination of all 10 categories). Tetsuya Ono (Japan) was 2nd overall, and  Lee Jeonghee (South Korea)  was 3rd.

Mental Calculation World Cup 2018

The Mental Calculation World Cup 2018 was held on 28–30 September 2018 at the Phaeno Science Center in Wolfsburg, Germany. 82 calculators from 24 countries applied for the qualification; 33 calculators from 17 countries were qualified and took part at the contest in Wolfsburg.

The World Cup involved the following 5 main contests:
Adding ten 10-digit numbers, 7 minutes
Winner: Lee Jeonghee (South Korea)
Multiplying two 8-digit numbers, 10 minutes
Winner: Tomohiro Iseda (Japan)
Calendar Calculations, one minute, random dates from the years 1600–2100
Winner:  (Spain), 71 correct results, world cup record
Square Roots from 6-digit numbers, 10 minutes
Winner: Tomohiro Iseda (Japan)
Most Versatile Calculator (the best score for solving another 5 unknown "surprise tasks")
Winner: Wenzel Grüß (Germany)

Tomohiro Iseda (Japan) won the title in the overall competition (combination of all 10 categories). Hiroto Ihara (Japan) finished second and Wenzel Grüß (Germany) third.

Mental Calculation World Cup 2020/22 
The Mental Calculation World Cup 2020 was planned to take place on 21–23 August 2020. Due to the COVID-19 pandemic, it had to be postponed. It was held on 15-17 July 2022 at Heinz Nixdorf MuseumsForum (world's largest computer museum) in Paderborn, Germany.
66 calculators applied for the qualification; 35 calculators from 17 countries were qualified and took part at the contest in Paderborn.

Aaryan Nitin Shukla (India) won the title in the overall competition (combination of all 10 categories). Tetsuya Ono (Japan) finished second and Mohammad El-Mir (Lebanon) third.

The World Cup involved the following 5 main contests:
Adding ten 10-digit numbers, 7 minutes
Winner: Tetsuya Ono (Japan), 32 points (34 correct, 2 incorrect results)
Multiplying two 8-digit numbers, 10 minutes
Winner: Aaryan Nitin Shukla (India), 21 points (23 correct, 2 incorrect results), world cup record 
Calendar Calculations, one minute, random dates from the years 1600–2100
Winner: Akshita Shah (India), 80 correct results, world cup record
Square Roots from 6-digit numbers, 10 minutes
Winner: Aaryan Nitin Shukla (India), 74 points (79 correct, 5 incorrect results), world cup record 
Most Versatile Calculator (the best score for solving another 5 unknown "surprise tasks")
Winner: Tetsuya Ono (Japan)

See also
List of world championships in mind sports
Mental calculation
Mental calculator
World Memory Championships

References

External links
Mental Calculation World Cup Index page
Tasks in the World Cup 2022
Tasks in the World Cup 2018
Tasks in the World Cup 2016
Tasks in the World Cup 2014
Tasks in the World Cup 2012
Tasks in the World Cup 2010
Memoriad report on MCWC 2012
Japanese abacus teacher wins Mental Calculation World Cup - article in Guardian.co.uk 

 
Mathematics competitions
Mental-skill competitions